Hartville is a village in Stark County, Ohio, United States. The population was 3,329 at the 2020 census. It is part of the Canton–Massillon metropolitan area.

Hartville lies halfway between Akron and Canton, at the intersection of two main roads, State Routes 43 and 619.

History 
Hartville was platted in 1851, most likely deriving its name from John , a first settler.

Geography
Hartville is located at  (40.962207, -81.339822).

Demographics

2020 census 
As of the census of 2020, there were 3,329 people . There were 1,455 housing units. The racial makeup of the village was 96.68% White, 0.00% African American, 0.72% Native American, 0.43% Asian, 0.0% from other races, and 2.17% from two or more races. Hispanic or Latino of any race were 0.72% of the population.

There were 1,326 households, of which 15.4% had children under the age of 18 living with them, 42% were married couples living together, 15.73% had a female householder with no husband present, 3.6% had a male householder with no wife present, and 38.67% were non-families. The  average family size was 2.8.

The median age in the village was 45.9 years. 15.4% of residents were under the age of 18; 84.6% were 18 and over; 25% are 65 and over.

2010 census
As of the census of 2010, there were 2,944 people, 1,154 households, and 806 families living in the village. The racial makeup of the village was 96.1% White, 0.8% African American, 0.1% Native American, 0.7% Asian, 0.5% from other races, and 1.9% from two or more races. Hispanic or Latino of any race were 1.0% of the population.

There were 1,154 households, of which 36.0% had children under the age of 18 living with them, 51.4% were married couples living together, 14.3% had a female householder with no husband present, 4.2% had a male householder with no wife present, and 30.2% were non-families. 26.5% of all households were made up of individuals, and 11.6% had someone living alone who was 65 years of age or older. The average household size was 2.52 and the average family size was 3.06.

The median age in the village was 38 years. 26.8% of residents were under the age of 18; 9.2% were between the ages of 18 and 24; 24% were from 25 to 44; 25.6% were from 45 to 64; and 14.5% were 65 years of age or older. The gender makeup of the village was 47.2% male and 52.8% female.

2000 census
As of the census of 2000, there were 2,174 people, 863 households, and 579 families living in the village. The population density was 1,186.2 people per square mile (458.7/km2). There were 902 housing units at an average density of 492.2 per square mile (190.3/km2). The racial makeup of the village was 98.39% White, 0.28% African American, 0.18% Native American, 0.18% Asian, 0.05% Pacific Islander, 0.28% from other races, and 0.64% from two or more races. Hispanic or Latino of any race were 0.83% of the population.

There were 863 households, out of which 33.6% had children under the age of 18 living with them, 52.1% were married couples living together, 12.3% had a female householder with no husband present, and 32.9% were non-families. 28.0% of all households were made up of individuals, and 8.3% had someone living alone who was 65 years of age or older. The average household size was 2.49 and the average family size was 3.09.

In the village, the population was spread out, with 26.9% under the age of 18, 10.1% from 18 to 24, 32.4% from 25 to 44, 19.6% from 45 to 64, and 11.0% who were 65 years of age or older. The median age was 34 years. For every 100 females there were 95.9 males. For every 100 females age 18 and over, there were 91.3 males.

The median income for a household in the village was $41,012, and the median income for a family was $47,411. Males had a median income of $34,821 versus $22,679 for females. The per capita income for the village was $19,362. About 6.2% of families and 9.2% of the population were below the poverty line, including 12.7% of those under age 18 and 4.9% of those age 65 or over.

Notable people
Aaron Brumbaugh, president of Shimer College
Andrew Wellington Cordier, a United Nations official and President of Columbia University

References

External links
 Village website
Discover Hartville

Villages in Stark County, Ohio
Villages in Ohio